The 2019 Singapore Sevens was a rugby sevens tournament played at the National Stadium in Singapore on 13–14 April 2019. It was the eighth edition of the Singapore Sevens and the eighth tournament of the 2018–19 World Rugby Sevens Series.

In the cup final, it was South Africa who took out their second Singapore title after they defeated Fiji by a single point. Third was England after they defeated United States by 21 points. France won the challenge trophy after defeating Scotland in the final.

Background
The Singapore Sevens is the eighth time that the Singapore event has been held with the seventh being in a World Series event. After winning the Hong Kong Sevens for the fifth consecutive time in the previous round, Fiji jumped past New Zealand to be in second place on the table. The United States still had the lead in the series but it was lowered down to only a seven-point gap between them and second place. For those two nations, depending on the results from the weekend they had a chance to book their spot at the 2020 Summer Olympics in Tokyo. Fourth place is South Africa with 99 points who hold a nine-point advantage over England.

Format
Sixteen teams are drawn into four pools of four teams each. Each team plays all the others in their pool once. The top two teams from each pool advance to the Cup quarter finals. The bottom two teams from each group advance to the Challenge Trophy quarter finals.

Teams 
Fifteen core teams played in the tournament along with one invitational team, runner-up of the 2018 Asia Rugby Sevens Series, Hong Kong:

Pool stage
All times in Singapore Standard Time (UTC+08:00).

Pool A

Pool B

Pool C

Pool D

Knockout stage

Thirteenth place

Challenge Trophy

5th place

Cup

Tournament placings

Source: World Rugby

Players

Scoring leaders

Source: World Rugby

Dream Team
The following seven players were selected to the tournament Dream Team at the conclusion of the tournament:

References

External links
 Tournament page
 World Rugby page

Singapore Sevens
Singapore
2019 in Singaporean sport
Singapore Sevens